Ahmend Faiz can refer to:

 Ahmed Faiz (athlete), a Saudi Arabian long jumper
 Ahmed Faiz (cricketer), a Malaysian cricketer
Ahmed Faiz (judge), Chief Justice of the supreme court of the Maldives